Pi or  is a mathematical constant equal to a circle's circumference divided by its diameter.

Pi, π or Π may also refer to:

Language and typography
 Pi (letter), in the Greek alphabet
 Pi characters, uncommon characters in typesetting
 Pi font, a term for some kinds of dingbat fonts
 Pali, an Indo-Aryan language (ISO 639-1 code: pi)

Places 
 Pi (state), an ancient state during China's Zhou dynasty
 Pi, Catalonia, a village of Bellver de Cerdanya, Spain
 Pi County, Sichuan province, China
 Pi Islands, Palmer Archipelago, Antarctica

People

Given name
 Pi de Bruijn (born 1942), Dutch architect 
Pi O or П. O. (born 1951), Greek-Australian anarchist poet
 Pi Schwert (1892–1941), American baseball player and politician
 Pi Vèriss, Dutch songwriter and composer

Surname
 Bi (surname), romanized as Pi in Wade–Giles
 Pi (surname), a Chinese surname
 Enric Pi (born 1983), Catalan footballer
 Francesc Pi i Margall (1824–1901), Catalan politician

 Jordi Sabater Pi (1922–2009), Catalan primatologist and ethologist
 Meritxell Mateu i Pi (born 1966), Andorran diplomat
 Ot Pi (born 1970), Catalan mountain bike trials rider
 Pedro Pi (1899–1970), Spanish sailor
 Renzo Pi Hugarte (1934–2012), Uruguayan anthropologist

Arts, entertainment, and media

Fictional characters
 Pi (.hack), in the multimedia franchise .hack//G.U.
 Pi, in both:
 Life of Pi, a 2001 novel, and
 Life of Pi (film), a 2012 adaptation
 Pi, a member of Team Robo in Sega Soccer Slam
 Pi, in the 2006 animated film Shark Bait and the 2012 sequel The Reef 2: High Tide

Music
 Pi (instrument), several traditional Thai reed instruments
 "π", a song by Kate Bush from Aerial
 "Pi", a song by Hard 'n Phirm from Horses and Grasses
 Pi Recordings, a record label

Other arts, entertainment, and media
 Pi (film), a 1998 film directed by Darren Aronofsky
P.I. (TV series), a 2017 Singaporean 1series
 Pi magazine, a student publication of the University College London Union
 Pi Studios, a video game developer

Science and mathematics

Chemistry and biochemistry
 π, a measure of nucleotide diversity
 Π or Osmotic pressure 
 Pi, an inorganic phosphate group
 Isoelectric point (pI), the pH at which a particular molecule carries no net electrical charge in the statistical mean
 Pi bond, a chemical bond

Logic and computer science
 Π, the symbol for maxterm notation in Karnaugh mapping
 Raspberry Pi, a single-board computer

Mathematics
 , a glyph representing the product of a sequence of terms
 , a set in the arithmetical hierarchy
 , a set in the analytical hierarchy
 , a set in the polynomial hierarchy
  (Pi function), the Gamma function when offset to coincide with the factorial
 , the complete elliptic integral of the third kind
 , the th homotopy group of 
 -calculus, a process calculus
 Prime-counting function or 
 , the population proportion in statistics

Physics
 Pion or π, a subatomic particle

Other uses 
 Pi (prefix symbol), or pebi, in computing
 Π, for plaintiff, in legal shorthand
 Π, stands for Pierikos F.C. kit logo
 Pi Day, March 14 (3/14 in the US)
 Principal investigator, a lead researcher
 Private investigator

See also 

 PI (disambiguation)
 
 
 
 P (disambiguation)
 Pai (disambiguation)
 Pie (disambiguation)
 Pye (disambiguation)